Maze is a prison film about the Maze Prison escape of 38 Provisional Irish Republican Army (IRA) prisoners in 1983. It was written and directed by Stephen Burke and released on 22 September 2017.

Cast
Tom Vaughan-Lawlor as Larry Marley
Barry Ward as Gordon
Martin McCann as Oscar
Eileen Walsh as Kate Marley
Aaron Monahan as Joe
Niamh McGrady as Jill
Ross McKinney as Danny Marley
Elva Trill as Young Widow
Tim Creed as Brendan 'Bik' McFarlane
Cillian O'Sullivan as Bobby Storey
Patrick Buchanan as Gerry Kelly
Andy Kellegher as Warder Williams
David Coakley as George
Will Irvine as Maguire
Stefan Dunbar as Ken
James Browne as Craig
Ella Connolly as Janet
Michael Power as John Adams
Robert Fawsitt as Tom
Seán T. Ó Meallaigh as Michael
Aiden O'Hare as O'Brien
Conor Charlton as Eoin
Stevie Greaney as Prisoner
Michelle Lehane as Estate Agent
James Tolcher as Main Gate Guard
Paul Elliot as Tower Soldier

Reception
The Traditional Unionist Voice party said "After watching the trailer I am deeply concerned that the film is going to show a one-sided, very biased account of the Maze break-out. There is no account at all given in the trailer by the prison officers who served us during the Troubles."

Alex Maskey of Sinn Féin said "At the end of the day a prison escape is of huge human interest worldwide so I have no doubt people will go and watch the film. I would recommend to people, go and watch it and make your judgement - I would hope it wouldn’t glorify anything which is inappropriate.”

The Playlist included it as one of their choices of underrated films of 2017

The film opened without previews to over €141,000 after its official release on Friday 22 September and was screened in more than 60 cinemas all over the island of Ireland. It set the 2017 record for the biggest opening weekend for an Irish film.

References

External links 
 

2017 films
English-language Irish films
2017 thriller drama films
Irish drama films
Drama films based on actual events
Films about the Irish Republican Army
Films about The Troubles (Northern Ireland)
Films set in 1983
Films set in Northern Ireland
2010s prison drama films
Films about prison escapes
2017 drama films
2010s English-language films